Anton Andreyevich Terekhov (born 30 January 1998) is a Russian football player who plays as right winger for Shinnik Yaroslavl.

Club career
He made his debut in the Russian Football Premier League for Dynamo Moscow on 17 April 2016 in a game against Krylia Sovetov Samara.

On 11 July 2019, he joined Krylia Sovetov Samara on loan for the 2019–20 season.

On 25 February 2021, he moved to Tambov on loan until the end of the 2020–21 season. Upon his return from Tambov loan, he did not train with the main squad and started the 2021–22 season with FC Dynamo-2 Moscow. On 26 January 2022, his contract with Dynamo was terminated by mutual consent.

On 7 February 2022, Terekhov signed with Neftekhimik Nizhnekamsk.

Career statistics

References

External links
 
 
 

1998 births
People from Surgut
Living people
Russian footballers
Russia youth international footballers
Association football midfielders
FC Dynamo Moscow players
PFC Krylia Sovetov Samara players
FC Tambov players
FC Neftekhimik Nizhnekamsk players
FC Shinnik Yaroslavl players
Russian Premier League players
Russian First League players
Russian Second League players